Back River, a perennial stream of the Manning River catchment, is located in the Northern Tablelands region of New South Wales, Australia.

Course and features
Back River on the eastern slopes of the Great Dividing Range, near Hanging Rock, east of Nundle, and flows generally east and then southeast before reaching its confluence with the Barnard River. The river descends  over its  course.

See also 

 Rivers of New South Wales
 List of rivers of New South Wales (A–K)
 List of rivers of Australia

References

Rivers of New South Wales
Northern Tablelands